The men's pole vault event at the 1961 Summer Universiade was held at the Vasil Levski National Stadium in Sofia, Bulgaria, with the final on 2 September 1961.

Medalists

Results

Qualifications

Final

References

Athletics at the 1961 Summer Universiade
1961